Jean Raoux (1916 – 11 January 2004) was a French général de brigade, who began his career during the Second World War and later fought in Indochina and Algeria.

Life

Early life
Jean Raoux was particularly noted for his knowledge of Arabic, completed by a licence ès-lettres. In his youth he frequently met with the writer Albert Camus in Algiers.

Education 
 Prepara Saint-Cyr at La Corniche (Alger)
 Ecole Spéciale Militaire de Saint-Cyr, promotion Marne et Verdun (1937–1939)
 Breveté at the Ecole de Guerre (Doctorate in National Defence on the American defence strategy under FD Roosevelt)
 Diplômé at the Ecole d'Etat-Major
 Licence in Arabic (Institut National des Langues et Civilisations Orientales)
 Licence in English
 Licence Es lettres

Second World War 
 1939 – Sous-Lieutenant – Assigned to the Caserne de Châteauroux to train reservists before the Battle of the Ardennes
 1940 – Lieutenant – Fought in the Ardennes during the Battle of France
 June 1940 – Captured by the Germans and escaped
 1941 – In the Free Zone he rejoined the 152e régiment d'infanterie
 1942 – At Clermont-Ferrand (then in the Free Zone) he married Marie-Paule Solelis (1920 – 5 October 2009) then returned to Algiers
 1942 – He joined the 16e régiment de tirailleurs algériens at Tlemcen and fought in the North African campaign
 1942 – Birth of his eldest daughter Marie-Françoise
 January – May 1943: Fought against the Germans in the Tunisian campaign
 1944 – He commanded a company of the 1st demi-brigade de Zouaves
 15 August 1944 – Participated in Operation Dragoon, landing at Cavalaire
 20 November 1944 – He actively participated in the liberation of Mulhouse under the command of Général de Lattre de Tassigny and joined the advance into Germany
 February 1945 – Birth of his son Bernard
 1945 – Under the orders of Colonel de Pouilly, he joined the 1re Division Blindée at Besançon

Indochina 
 1946: Captain: 10e Promotion de l'Ecole d'Etat-Major
 17 December 1948: Birth of his daughter Catherine (married Joannidès in 1972) at Besançon
 1948–1952: Put in command of 1re région militaire
 1952–1955: Appointed to the France's High Commission to Laos; operated in Cochinchina at the head of a unit of Cambodians

Also whilst in Indochina he was councillor to his majesty Norodom Sihanouk, king of Cambodia, as well as Maréchal de Lattre de Tassigny's personal English translator. He also met Graham Greene in Indochina and advised him on the publication of his The Quiet American.

Algeria 
 1955–1958: Ministère des Armées, liaison officer with the British Army
 1958–1960: Chef de bataillon in the Aures
 Councillor to his majesty Hassan II of Morocco

Later career 
 1964: Ecole supérieure de guerre
 1966–1968 – Colonel: Commandement of the 75e régiment d'infanterie de ligne at Valence
 1969–1972 – Groupe d'organisation des manoeuvres nationales to the Ecole Militaire in Paris, where his son Bernard, Sous-Lieutenant joined him in the Groupe de Recherche Opérationnelle de l'Armée de Terre
 1972 – Made Général in the Conseil des Ministres

Decorations

Honours
 Officer of the Légion d'Honneur
 Commander of the Ordre National du Mérite
 Croix de guerre 1939-1945 (three citations)
 Croix de guerre des TOE with Palm
 Croix de la Valeur Militaire with Palm
 Chevalier dans l'ordre du Mérite Agricole
 Médaillé du Corps expéditionnaire français d'Extrême-Orient (Vietnam, Laos, Cambodia)
 Médaillé des opérations de sécurité et de maintien de l'ordre en Algérie
 Decorated in the Order of a Million Elephants (Laos)

Citations 
He won six citations, of which two were in dispatches.

Tunisian campaign (citation in the divisional orders with the Croix de guerre)

French campaign (three days after entering the campaign) 

1916 births
2004 deaths
People from Dellys
Pieds-Noirs
French generals
French military personnel of World War II
Free French military personnel of World War II
French military personnel of the First Indochina War
French military personnel of the Algerian War
Officiers of the Légion d'honneur
Commanders of the Ordre national du Mérite
Recipients of the Croix de Guerre 1939–1945 (France)
Recipients of the Croix de guerre des théâtres d'opérations extérieures
Recipients of the Cross for Military Valour
Knights of the Order of Agricultural Merit
Migrants from French Algeria to France